The Real River or Rio Real ("Royal River") is a river in Brazil. It forms the border between the states of Sergipe to its north and Bahia to its south. It gave its name to the nearby municipality of Rio Real, Brazil.



See also
List of rivers of Sergipe
List of rivers of Bahia

References

Citations

Bibliography
 .
 .

Rivers of Sergipe
Rivers of Bahia